The 2017 Coupe de la Ligue Final was the 23rd final of France's football league cup competition, the Coupe de la Ligue, a competition for the 42 teams that the Ligue de Football Professionnel (LFP) manages. The final took place on 1 April 2017 at the Parc Olympique Lyonnais in Décines-Charpieu and was contested by Monaco and reigning champions Paris Saint-Germain.

Paris Saint-Germain won the final 4–1 for their 4th consecutive and 7th overall Coupe de la Ligue title.

Route to the final
Note: In all results below, the score of the finalist is given first (H: home; A: away).

Match

Details

References

External links
 
 

2017
Cup
AS Monaco FC matches
Paris Saint-Germain F.C. matches
Sports competitions in Lyon
April 2017 sports events in France